Manuel Méndez (born 10 June 1962) is a Puerto Rican sailor. He competed in the Finn event at the 1996 Summer Olympics.

References

External links
 

1962 births
Living people
Puerto Rican male sailors (sport)
Olympic sailors of Puerto Rico
Sailors at the 1996 Summer Olympics – Finn
Place of birth missing (living people)